Abraham Isaak (October 4, 1856 – December 10, 1937) was a newspaper editor and Russian anarchist. He was raised in the Mennonite village of Rosenthal, part of the Chortitza Colony, but later settled in the U.S.

Biography

Abraham Isaak was the second of 12 children born to Abraham Isaak (1832–1898) and Helena Wiebe (1835–1882).

Isaak was best known for his editing and publishing the American anarchist weeklies the Firebrand (1895–1897) and Free Society (1897–1904), Isaak was less a theorist than an activist. His acquaintances and friends included the Russian anarchists Peter Kropotkin and Emma Goldman.

Isaak came to regret his move to New York in 1904 where Free Society faced financial problems that forced its closure in November of that year. Emma Goldman's Mother Earth, which first appeared in 1906, was an attempt to fill the anarchists' subsequent literary void.

Political and ethical beliefs
Isaak only twice referred to his Mennonite past in the Firebrand and Free Society. This extended quote is taken from the former:

Although Isaak was an ex-Mennonite, he continued to espouse many traditional Anabaptist principles such as pacifism, mutual aid and socio-economic equality that Anarchist theorists have promoted and that Isaak believed represented the best of his own Mennonite tradition.

Later life

Nothing suggests Isaak resumed newspaper work. In fact, he became involved in such establishment organizations as the Farm Bureau and other civic organizations. Maria Isaak died of pneumonia on April 17, 1934; Isaak, according to his death certificate, died of acute pancreatitis on December 10, 1937. Four years before his death Isaak wrote to his friend, Harry Kelly: "First, the railroads took our pears and plums and $70 to boot; the good Lord took our citrus fruit (by frost), and two weeks ago the Bank of Lincoln closed its doors, where we had our last savings...." He concluded: "Some 30 years ago Thorsten Veblen told me in Chicago that the machine would break capitalism sooner than the efforts of revolutionists, and it seems his prediction is coming true."

References

Further reading
 
 
 
 
Reichert, William O. Partisans of Freedom: A Study in American Anarchism. Bowling Green: Bowling Green University Popular Press. 1971. PP. 261–277
 
 
  (Brief mention of Free Society but not Isaak).

1856 births
1937 deaths
American anarchists
American anti-capitalists
American pacifists
American people of Russian descent
People from Lincoln, California
Russian anarchists
Russian anti-capitalists
Emigrants from the Russian Empire to the United States
Russian pacifists
Writers from Portland, Oregon